Aspergillus reptans is a species of fungus belonging to the family Aspergillaceae.

It is native to Eurasia and Northern America.

Synonyms: 
 Aspergillus repens (Corda) Sacc

References

reptans